PS-129 Karachi Central-VII is a constituency of the Provincial Assembly of Sindh.

General elections 2018

General elections 2013

See also
 PS-128 Karachi Central-VI
 PS-130 Karachi Central-VIII

References

External links
 Election commission Pakistan's official website
 Awazoday.com check result
 Official Website of Government of Sindh

Constituencies of Sindh